William Patrick Fyfe (born February 27, 1955) is a Canadian serial killer convicted of killing five women in the Montreal area of Quebec, although he claims to have killed four others. He allegedly killed his first victim in 1979 at age the of 24.

Early life
Billy Fyfe was born in Toronto, Ontario. He was raised by an aunt and in 1958 moved from central Canada to  the Parc Extension area of Montreal. He lived as a normal child, although friends did have suspicions about the boy as he grew up.  As an adult, he worked as a handyman.

Murders
DNA evidence on the door frame at Mary Glen's house led police to charge Fyfe for the murders. The Ontario Provincial Police (OPP) arrested him on 22 December 1999, while he was returning to his pick-up truck after eating at a Husky Truck Stop near Barrie, Ontario. He has confessed to only a portion of the crimes that he is suspected of committing.

Fyfe's preliminary hearing began on 6 November 2000. Jean Lecours was the crown prosecutor heading up the case against Fyfe. He is now serving a life sentence in a maximum facility in Saskatchewan. The four last victims he admitted to only after being incarcerated.

He is also suspected by Montreal Police of being the serial rapist commonly known as "The Plumber" who was responsible for a string of violent rapes during the 1980s in downtown Montreal.

Known victims
 Hazel Scattolon, a 52-year-old woman who was stabbed to death  and sexually assaulted in 1981.
 Anna Yarnold, a 59-year-old woman who was bludgeoned to death  on 15 October 1999 in Senneville, Quebec
 Monique Gaudreau, a 46-year-old woman who was stabbed to death on 29 October 1999 in Sainte-Agathe-des-Monts, Quebec.
 Teresa Shanahan, a 55-year-old woman who was stabbed to death in November 1999 in Laval, Quebec.
 Mary Glen, a 50-year-old woman who was beaten and stabbed to death on 15 December 1999 in Baie-D'Urfé, Quebec

See also
List of serial killers by country

References
Quebec killer confesses to more murders CBC News. 2001-11-22. Retrieved 2007-02-10.

1955 births
Canadian people convicted of murder
Canadian people of Scottish descent
Canadian prisoners sentenced to life imprisonment
Canadian rapists
Canadian serial killers
Living people
Male serial killers
People convicted of murder by Canada
People from Toronto
Prisoners sentenced to life imprisonment by Canada
Violence against women in Canada
Women in Quebec